Jean-François René Pontal (born 17 April 1943) is a French businessman, and a former Chief Executive of Orange S.A.

Early life
Child of the official Gaston Pontal, he has a degree in Engineering in 1966 from the Centre d'études supérieures des techniques industrielles (CESTI), now called Supméca, part of Polyméca.

Career
Orange (UK) was bought by France Télécom in May 2000 for £25 billion. France Télécom changed its name to Orange S.A. He had worked at France Télécom since 1996.

Orange
He was Chief Executive (directeur général or PDG) of Orange (worldwide) from January 2001 until 24 March 2003.

See also
 Graham Howe (businessman), his deputy chief executive at Orange.

References

Businesspeople in telecommunications
French chief executives
Orange S.A.
1943 births
Living people